Anderson Spring is a spring in southeastern Oregon County in the Ozarks of southern Missouri. The spring lies one mile south of U.S. Route 160 and one mile east of the Eleven Point River.  A small stream flows west from the spring into the Eleven Point.

Anderson Spring has the name of James Anderson, an early citizen.

See also
List of rivers of Missouri

References

Bodies of water of Oregon County, Missouri
Springs of Missouri